The British actor and comedian Peter Sellers (1925–1980) performed in many genres of light entertainment, including film, radio and theatre. He appeared in the BBC Radio comedy series The Goon Show, recorded a number of hit comic songs and became known internationally through his many film characterisations, among them Chief Inspector Clouseau in The Pink Panther film series. The filmmakers John and Roy Boulting described him as "the greatest comic genius [Britain] has produced since Charles Chaplin".

Sellers's career on radio, film, television and record spanned from 1948 until his death. He made his radio debut on ShowTime in 1948, followed by appearances in Ray's a Laugh, Starlight Hour, The Gang Show, Henry Hall's Guest Night and It's Fine to Be Young. Along with Spike Milligan, Harry Secombe and Michael Bentine, he took part in the radio series The Goon Show (1951–60). Throughout his career, Sellers made a number of television appearances, in character roles and for interviews and advertisements. His stage appearances were few, largely because he had been unhappy with the touring he had done as a child with his family. During his career, he also released a number of albums containing sketches and comic songs; the songs were undertaken in a variety of comic characters.

Starting in the 1950s, Sellers appeared in over fifty films, including I'm All Right Jack, Dr. Strangelove, Lolita, Being There and the Pink Panther series. At the peak of his career, he was one of the most popular stars at the British box office: third in most popular films in 1962, and second in 1963. Sellers's versatility enabled him to portray a wide range of comic characters using different accents and guises, and he would often assume multiple roles within the same film. In 2005, Channel 4 conducted a survey of modern-day comedians, who ranked Sellers the 14th most influential comedian of all time.

Stage credits 

At the start of his career, Sellers also performed acts in a number of variety shows in various parts of Britain; his wartime service with the Gang Shows of Ralph Reader saw him perform in India, Ceylon and Burma.

Selected radio broadcasts 

Sellers also appeared in supporting roles in a number of other radio programmes from the 1940s to the 1970s.

Filmography

Awards and nominations

Television 
Main series and appearances

Selected guest appearances

Advertisements

Discography

Albums

Studio albums

Other albums

Compilation albums

Box sets

EPs

Singles

Contributions

References

Notes

Footnotes

Bibliography

External links 
 
 
 
 Peter Sellers on Pathé News

Male actor filmographies
British filmographies
Discographies of British artists
Filmographies